This is the order of battle for the Battle of the Somme. The Battle of the Somme was an offensive fought on the Western Front during World War I from 1 July to 18 November 1916 as one of the greatest engagements of the war. It was fought between French, British and Dominion forces and the German Empire in the Somme River valley and vicinity in northern France.

Background

British and Dominion forces
In typical British county regiments, the 1st and 2nd Battalions were regular army, the 3rd was the special reserve battalion which did not normally serve overseas but remained at home as the regimental depot and training unit, from which replacements were sent to the regular battalions. The 4th, 5th and 6th Battalions were normally Territorial Force battalions. Amongst the terms of service in the Territorial Force, service outside the United Kingdom was voluntary. Territorial battalions raised second line battalions which would be numbered 2/4th, 2/5th and 2/6th, initially from men who declined to volunteer for overseas service. The number of battalions depended on the recruitment potential of the area from which the battalions were raised (the Dorsetshire Regiment raised eleven battalions, whilst the London Regiment managed to raise eighty-eight battalions). Regular army divisions were numbered 1st to 8th. "New Army" divisions of Kitchener's Army raised after the outbreak of war were numbered 9th to 26th. The 27th to 29th Divisions were Regular army divisions made up from units recalled from garrisons around the empire. The 30th to 41st were New Army and the 42nd to 74th were Territorial. The 63rd Division (Royal Naval Division) was made up from Naval Reserves and did not follow this numbering pattern.

Army and Corps organisation

Army
 British Expeditionary Force: Commander: General Sir Douglas Haig (since 10 December 1915)
 Third Army: Army Commander: General Sir Edmund Allenby
 Fourth Army: The Fourth Army was formed on 5 February 1916.  Army Commander: General Sir Henry Rawlinson.
 Reserve Army: The Reserve Army was formed on 23 May 1916 and took over VIII and X Corps from the Fourth Army on 4 July 1916, during the Battle of Albert.  Army Commander: General Sir Hubert Gough
 Fifth Army: The Reserve Army was renamed the Fifth Army on 30 October 1916

Corps
 II Corps. Corps Commander: Lieutenant-General Claud Jacob
 III Corps. Corps Commander: Major-General Henry Hudson later replaced by Lieutenant-General Sir William Pulteney
 V Corps. Corps Commander: Lieutenant-General Edward Fanshawe
 VII Corps. Corps Commander: Lieutenant-General Sir Thomas d'Oyly Snow
 VIII Corps. Corps Commander: Lieutenant-General Aylmer Hunter-Weston
 X Corps. Corps Commander: Lieutenant-General Sir Thomas Morland
 XIII Corps. Corps Commander: Lieutenant-General Walter Congreve VC
 XIV Corps. Corps Commander: Lieutenant-General Rudolph Lambart, 10th Earl of Cavan
 XV Corps. Corps Commander: Lieutenant General D.M.G. Campbell, then Lt–Gen Henry Horne then Lt–General John du Cane
 Canadian Corps. Corps Commander: Lieutenant-General the Honourable Sir Julian Byng
 ANZAC Corps. Corps Commander: Lieutenant-General Sir William Birdwood
 Machine Gun Corps

French Sixth Army, which contained British or Dominion forces:
 20th Army Corps.  The 11th and 39th Divisions were attached to the French XX Corps (Sixth Army) for the opening days of the battle.
 35th Army Corps.  The British 2nd Division was detached to XXXV Corps, Sixth Army.

Formations per battle
Refer following section titled "Divisions" for brigades, regiments and battalions associated with each division participating in the listed battles.  Battle nomenclature and participating units information taken from source British Army Council Command Notice 1138 unless stated.

Battle of Albert: 1–13 July
 Capture of Montauban
 Capture of Mametz
 Capture of Fricourt
 Capture of Contalmaison
 Capture of La Boisselle

Subsidiary Attack on the Gommecourt Salient: 1 July

Battle of Bazentin Ridge: 14–17 July
 Capture of Longueval
 Capture of Trônes Wood
 Capture of Ovillers

Subsidiary Attack at Fromelles: 19 July

Subsidiary Attacks on High Wood: 20–25 July

Battle of Delville Wood: 15 July – 3 September

Battle of Pozières: 23 July – 3 September
 Fighting for Mouquet Farm

Battle of Guillemont: 3–6 September

Battle of Ginchy: 9 September

Battle of Flers-Courcelette: 15–22 September
 Capture of Martinpuich

Battle of Morval: 25–28 September
 Capture of Combles
 Capture of Lesbœufs
 Capture of Gueudecourt

Battle of Thiepval: 26–28 September

Battle of Le Transloy: 1–18 October
 Capture of Eaucourt l'Abbaye
 Capture of Le Sars
 Attacks on the Butte de Warlencourt

Battle of the Ancre Heights: 1–18 October
 Capture of Schwaben Redoubt
 Capture of Stuff Redoubt
 Capture of Regina Trench

Battle of the Ancre: 13–16 November
 Capture of Beaumont-Hamel

Divisions

Regular Army and Naval divisions

New Army divisions

Territorial divisions

Dominion divisions

Royal Flying Corps
 No. 1 Squadron RFC
 No. 2 Squadron RFC
 No. 3 Squadron RFC
 No. 4 Squadron RFC
 No. 6 Squadron RFC
 No. 9 Squadron RFC
 No. 10 Squadron RFC
 No. 41 Squadron RFC
 No. 70 Squadron RFC

French forces
A majority of the French Divisions were triangular divisions –  comprising three regiments, with each regiment containing three battalions. During the Battle of Verdun, General Pétain had rotated the French Divisions through the battle – resulting in a large number of divisions entering the Battle of the Somme with experience.

Army and corps organisation

Army
 Northern Army Group Commander: General Ferdinand Foch
 Sixth Army: Army Commander: General Marie Émile Fayolle
 Tenth Army: Army Commander: General Joseph Alfred Micheler

Corps
 I Corps. Corps Commander: General Adolphe Guillaumat
 II Corps. Corps Commander: General Denis Auguste Duchêne
 V Corps. Corps Commander: General Antoine Baucheron de Boissoudy
 VI Corps. Corps Commander: General Marie Jean Auguste Paulinier
 VII Corps. Corps Commander: General Georges de Bazelaire
 IX Corps. Corps Commander: General Horace Fernand Achille Pentel
 XI Corps. Corps Commander: General Charles Mangin
 XX Corps. Corps Commander: Generals Georges Prosper Anne Claret de la Touche and Émile Alexis Mazillier
 XXI Corps. Corps Commander: General Paul Maistre
 XXX Corps. Corps Commander: General Paul Chrétien
 XXXII Corps. Corps Commander: Generals Henri Mathias Berthelot and Marie-Eugène Debeney
 XXXIII Corps. Corps Commander: General Alphonse Nudant
 XXXV Corps. Corps Commander: General Charles Jacquot
 I Colonial Corps. Corps Commander: General Pierre Berdoulat
 II Colonial Corps. Corps Commander: General Ernest Joseph Blondlat
 I Cavalry Corps. Corps Commander: General Louis Conneau
 II Cavalry Corps. Corps Commander: General Antoine de Mitry
(Note: A majority of the corps and divisions were transferred from other armies during the battle.)

Infantry divisions

 1st Infantry Division
 2nd Infantry Division
 3rd Infantry Division
 4th Infantry Division
 10th Infantry Division
 11th Infantry Division
 12th Infantry Division
 13th Infantry Division
 14th Infantry Division
 17th Infantry Division
 18th Infantry Division
 20th Infantry Division
 25th Infantry Division
 26th Infantry Division
 39th Infantry Division
 41st Infantry Division
 42nd Infantry Division
 43rd Infantry Division
 45th Infantry Division
 46th Infantry Division
 47th Infantry Division
 48th Infantry Division
 51st Infantry Division
 53rd Infantry Division
 56th Infantry Division
 61st Infantry Division
 62nd Infantry Division
 66th Infantry Division
 70th Infantry Division
 72nd Infantry Division
 77th Infantry Division
 120th Infantry Division
 121st Infantry Division
 125th Infantry Division
 127th Infantry Division
 132nd Infantry Division
 152nd Infantry Division
 153rd Infantry Division
 Moroccan Infantry Division
 2nd Colonial Infantry Division
 3rd Colonial Infantry Division
 10th Colonial Infantry Division
 15th Colonial Infantry Division
 16th Colonial Infantry Division

Cavalry divisions

 1st Cavalry Division
 2nd Cavalry Division
 3rd Cavalry Division
 4th Cavalry Division

German: 2nd Army
German order of battle derived from Hart, Appendix C unless stated.
Chief of the German General Staff:  Erich Falkenhayn (until 28 August 1916),  Paul von Hindenburg. German divisions were being converted from square to triangular, hence some had four infantry regiments, others had three.

Guards divisions

Line divisions

Guards Reserve divisions

Reserve Infantry divisions

Ersatz divisions

Notes

Citations and references

Citations

References

Books
 
 
 
 
 
 
 
 
 
 

Websites

Further reading

External links

 Order of Battle of British Infantry Units, 1 July 1916, Imperial War Museum

Battle of the Somme
Somme
Somme
Somme
Somme
Somme
Somme
Somme
Somme
Somme
1916 in France